Shwe U Daung (24 October 1889—10 August 1973) was a Burmese writer, translator and editor. He is known for creating the character "Detective U San Shar," considered the Burmese equivalent of Sherlock Holmes. He received many awards including the Sarpay Beikman awards.

Early life and education

Shwe U Daung was born Pe Thein on 24 October 1889 in the Shwebo District, British Burma (now Myanmar). His father, U Ayar, was a British citizen, and his mother was Daw Shwe. He was the third of five siblings. Shwe attended the Buddhist School in Mandalay and later transferred to the Monastery of Mandalay and ABM school. In 1908, after passing the entrance exam at the University of Calcutta, he worked as a teacher at the Mandalay Buddhist school and the ABM school.

Career 
On 8 November 1915, his first novel Yan Gyi Aung was published. His second novel Yadanapon, which was written by the request of Thura U Ba Bay, was inspired by Ellen Wood's novel East Lynne. Having published two novels, Shwe U Daung became the editor of Thuriya magazine. It was at this time that he was given the pen name Shwe U Daung. While working as an editor in Thuriya, Shwe U Daung collaborated with a friend and jointly published the first issue of Myanmar Strategic Journal. In 1920, he left the Thuriya magazine.

Shwe U Daung died on 10 August 1973.

Published books

Shwe U Daung, 1953
Yadanabon, 1953 (novel)
Detective U San Shar, 1961
Yupa Kalayar Ni, 1961

Legacy
The Ludu Library in Mandalay houses a complete collection of Shwe U Daung's works.

References

1889 births
1973 deaths
Burmese writers
People from Sagaing Region